Minuscule 2437 (in the Gregory-Aland numbering), is a Greek minuscule manuscript of the New Testament, on 220 parchment leaves (20 by 15 cm). Paleographically it has been assigned to the 11th or 12th century.

Description 

The codex contains almost complete text of the four Gospels with some lacunae. The text is written in one column per page, 24 lines per page. Quotations from the Old Testament are marked. It contains some pictures. 

The Greek text of the codex is a representative of the Byzantine text-type. Aland placed it in Category V.

According to the Claremont Profile Method it represents textual cluster 1519 in Luke 1, Luke 10, and Luke 20.

It is currently housed at the Biblioteca Nacional (I. 2) at Rio de Janeiro. It is the most ancient manuscript of the New Testament, which is housed in the Latin America.

See also 
 List of New Testament minuscules
 Textual criticism

References

Further reading 

 Bruce M. Metzger, "Un Manuscrito greco dos quatro evangelhos na Biblioteca Nacional do Rio de Janeiro", Revista teológica 2 (Rio de Janeiro, 1952-1953), pp. 5-10.

External links 

 Paulo José Benício, Análise Filológica e Teológica da Abertura do Evangelho Segundo Marcos no Manuscrito 2437 

Greek New Testament minuscules
11th-century biblical manuscripts